The Children of Sanchez is a 1978 Mexican-American drama film based on the book with the same title by Oscar Lewis. The film was entered into the 11th Moscow International Film Festival.

The movie's well-known soundtrack, titled Children of Sanchez, was created by jazz musician Chuck Mangione. Its opening song won the Grammy Award for Best Pop Instrumental Performance for that year.

Plot

The film chronicles the life of Mr. Sanchez (Anthony Quinn) and his struggles with the culture of poverty around him. A widowed farmer, he cares for his family in a marginal area of Mexico City. While being a hard worker who feels the duty to financially support his family, he is still an aggressive, domineering man and a womanizer. His main conflict is with his daughter, Consuelo (Lupita Ferrer), a rebellious girl who attempts to break free from her father. She strives to escape her role of dutiful daughter and pursue her own dreams. Consuelo likes to talk with her grandmother (Dolores del Río), who secretly advises her to find a man and get married. This is the only way that she, an uneducated poor woman, can escape her father.

Reception
Among those in attendance at the film's American premiere, which was held on November 16, 1978, were U.S. President Jimmy Carter and First Lady Rosalynn Carter, both of whom were greeted by performers Ferrer and Quinn as well as director Bartlett. Quinn himself escorted the President and the First Lady to their seats. All proceeds went to the Mexican American Legal Defense and Educational Fund.

The musical score for the film was written by Chuck Mangione and won a Grammy award. The film's title song was also written by Mangione and earned him a Grammy for Best Pop Instrumental Performance.

Cast
 Anthony Quinn as Jesús Sánchez
 Dolores del Río as Grandma Paquita
 Katy Jurado as Chata
 Lupita Ferrer as Consuelo Sánchez
 Lucia Mendez as Martha Sanchez
 Josefina Echanove as Lupe
 Patricia Reyes Spindola as Paula's sister
 Stathis Giallelis as Roberto

See also

Children of Sanchez - album
The Children of Sanchez - book

References

External links

1978 films
1978 drama films
American drama films
Mexican drama films
Films based on non-fiction books
Films directed by Hall Bartlett
1970s English-language films
1970s American films
1970s Mexican films